The 2002 Asian Junior Women's Volleyball Championship was held in Ho Chi Minh City, Vietnam from 1 September to 8 September 2002.

Pools composition
The teams are seeded based on their final ranking at the 2000 Asian Junior Women's Volleyball Championship.

Preliminary round

Pool A

|}

|}

Pool B

|}

Classification 9th–12th

Semifinals

|}

11th place

|}

9th place

|}

Classification 5th–8th

Final round

Final standing

External links
 www.jva.or.jp

A
V
V
Asian women's volleyball championships
Asian Junior